The 1987 Florida Gators football team represented the University of Florida during the 1987 NCAA Division I-A football season. The season was the fourth for Galen Hall as the head coach of the Florida Gators football team.  Hall's 1987 Florida Gators posted a 6–6 overall record and a Southeastern Conference (SEC) record of 3–3, placing sixth among ten SEC teams.

The season was the debut of freshman running back Emmitt Smith.  Smith went on to break the 1,000-yard barrier in the seventh game of his freshman season, the fastest any running back had ever broken that barrier to begin his college career, and was named SEC and national freshman of the year. This was the last year until 2017 that Florida opened the season away from Gainesville.

Schedule

Personnel

Rankings

References

Florida
Florida Gators football seasons
Florida Gators football